Masuleh  (also Romanized as Māsūleh, Masoleh and Masouleh is a village in  the Sardar-e Jangal District, in Fuman County, Gilan Province, Iran.  At the 2006 census, its population was 554 individuals from 180 families.

Historical names for the city include Māsalar and Khortāb. It was founded in the 10th century AD.

Masuleh is approximately 60 km southwest of Rasht and 32 km west of Fuman. The village is 1,050 meters above sea level in the Alborz (or Elburz) mountain range, near the southern coast of the Caspian Sea. The village itself has a difference in elevation of 100 meters.

Although it has been written that the community was established around 10 AD, the province of Gilan has a long history. The first village of Masuleh was established around 1006 AD, 6 km northwest of the current city, and it is called Old-Masuleh (Kohneh Masuleh in Persian). People moved from Old-Masuleh to the current city because of pestilence and attacks from neighbouring communities.

Masouheh-Rood-Khan is the river passing through the city, with a waterfall located just 200 meters away from the village. It's cut-off by snow during the winter months. Fog is the predominant weather feature of Masuleh.

Architecture 
Masuleh’s architecture is unique. The buildings have been built into the mountain and are interconnected. Courtyards and roofs both serve as pedestrian areas similar to streets. However, the small streets and many stairs simply wouldn't make it possible for vehicles to enter. Masuleh does not allow any motor vehicles to enter, due to its unique layout. It is the only city in Iran with such a prohibition.

The spectacular architecture of Masuleh is popularly known as "The yard of the building above is the roof of the building below".

Yellow clay coats the exterior of most buildings in Masuleh. This allows for better visibility in the fog.

Buildings are mostly two stories (1st floor and 'ground' floor) made of adobe, rods and bole. A small living room, big guest room, winter room, hall, WC and balcony are usually found in 1st floor. A cold closet, barn and stable are located on the floor below, which are connected to the upper floor by several narrow steps inside the building.

There are four main local communities at the city named: "Maza-var" (meaning beside the Mosque) at the south, "Khana-var" (beside homes) at the East, "Kasha-sar" (stretched on top) at the North, and, "Assa-mahala" (Assad community) at the West. Apparently, down town is the Market (Bazaar) area and also the main mosque of the city, named "O-ne-ben-ne Ali" (Awn Ibn Mohammad Ibn Ali Ibn. Abi Taleb) built in 969 AD.

Girih Tiling in Buildings of Masouleh

Due to avoiding utilization of human figures and abstaining from idolatry, decorations have specific geometry in Islamic art and architecture. One of the striking characteristics of the knots (girih) that has caused to dynamicity throughout its thousand-year history is its regeneration and diversification of the diverse geometric properties. Girih tiling decoration is part of geometric arts in the traditional buildings of the historic town of Masouleh dates back to eight hundred years. Traditional and local architects of this historical town have adopted special and intellectual plans for creating visual attractions in expression and creation of girih tiling in the walls of the monuments. One of these valuable solutions is diverse geometric decorations patterns. Since the main facades of the houses in this town are directly located in the sunrise direction and it is accepted landscape for the citizens of this historical town, thus the artists have shown their art and style in this part of the monument and built beautiful and harmonic diverse wooden windows and variety of these patterns are seen in all five neighborhoods in this town. Girih tiling consists of straight and broken lines on a regular basis that could be reasonably expanded in the surface.

Geometric designs (both normal and abnormal) and purely geometric interlaced patterns involve mental imaginary forms which are essentially superior to the perception- based naturalistic images. The patterns were not aimed to capture the reality perceived through the eyes, but they were supposed to create a glimpse of astonishing beauty in the artist’s creative mind or soul. Due to avoiding utilization of human figures and abstaining from idolatry, decorations have specific geometry in Islamic art and architecture. One of the striking characteristics of the knots (girih) that has caused to dynamicity throughout its thousand-year history is its regeneration and diversification of the diverse geometric properties. Girih tiles are used in Islamic art and architecture. Iranian Chinese Knotting is one of is one of traditional fields and professions that depends on geometrical patterns and on the first encounter, the spectator, is subconsciously affected by its discipline. Geometrical patterns, which are the source for the art Chinese Knotting, usually contain a polygon star in
the middle (the Shamseh) and some other geometrical figures so that they can cover the remaining space. Chinese knotting is not specifically a certain decoration or a means of conveying the emotions of the artist, but also the point of making them regarding to two ways: acting on the basis of their own knowledge and guiding others towards this knowledge. When a spectator looks upon the works of Chinese Knotting, they’re first affected by its beauty and especially its discipline, but after some more contemplation they are driven into the art’s mystical meanings. Girih tile is a part of Islamic architecture and art while its different types are used in the following arts: Wood carving, tiling, plaster, Khātam, brick work, mirror work, stone work and in carpentry as fences, door and window, wooden decorations and wood carving of Minbar and in blacksmith Iranian architecture. Girih tile is an intelligent interaction of aesthetics and function. Islamic artists have applied local materials in accordance to the functional requirements and cultural issues of each region. The valuable examples of this art are observed in historical city of Masoule located in the mountainous area of Masoule in Gilan (Iran). Wood is one of the highly applied materials in traditional architecture of Gilan with its different types. One of the greatest arts is seen in the historical city of Masoule with Girih tiles. Wood is used in this region due to its climatic condition and the need to a good thermal isolation against heat and cold weather. Also, wood is the first material being
applied in openings. Girih tiles decorations in this historical city are abundant in the buildings while their main façade is to the south. One of the advantages of using Girih tiles in openings of this historical city is to control the direct light in
different seasons of year. The aesthetic aspect is on the second priority. The beauty of Girih tiles, their coordination and part to total tendency in all openings have improved the unity and beauty of the historical buildings of Masoule. Sash window, other meshes and Telar with combination of decorative plants in the façade of buildings in Masoule have increased the aesthetics of this city. Historical city of Masoule is a good model for sustainable architecture and its final aim is respecting the culture and friendly relationship with nature and improving the life style of its residents.

Archaeology 
Archaeological survey of the mountain ranges overlooking Masouleh shows that this mountainous region was probably occupied by ancient herders and nomads at least since the late Bronze Age. Remains of late prehistoric, historic, and Islamic times were discovered on the mountain top above 2500 meters above sea level(See). These mountains were used seasonally, at least since the late Neolithic (5000 BC) Bronze Age  (2000-1500 BC), which continued during the Iron Age I (1500-1100 BC), Iron Age  III (800-500 BC), Parthian  (247 BC to 224 CE), Buyid (943–1029 CE), Seljuk (1043–1051 CE) and Ilkhanid  (1306–1335 CE) periods(tehrantimes).

The oldest evidence of human presence in the Masuleh region was discovered on a mountaintop above 2400 m above sea level, not far from Shah Moalem, one of the highest peaks in the Talysh Mountains of Gilan. The site shows that the late Neolithic herders used the pastures of these mountaintops to graze their herds. The site is the oldest and highest seasonal settlement of prehistoric herders that have been identified so far in the south of the Caspian Sea. Archaeologists discovered pottery sherds, animal bones, and stone tools that date back to about 7ooo years ago.

Masoleh tourism areas 
Market (bazar)

Museum of Anthropology Masuleh: Established in 2002 and incorporates the history of Masuleh and its people.

Forest park: Masouleh Forest Park is one of the most beautiful forest parks in northern Iran and even in the Middle East. The variety of plants in this park is very large and trees like rush, alder, hornbeam, hazelnut, as well as herbs are seen in it.

Waterfalls: Kooshm, Larcheshme, and Kourbar.

Masuleh also has its own beauties in winter and tourists can enjoy its beauties in this season as well.

Gallery

Language 
The native people of Masuleh speak Talysh.

See also 

Sar Agha Seyed Village
Zonouz

References

External links

 Masuleh Pictures
 HORIZIN, Masuleh, Photo Set, flikr
 Iran Cultural Heritage, Handicrafts and Tourism Organization: 
 WiseItinerary

Populated places in Fuman County
Cities in Gilan Province
Tourist attractions in Gilan Province